Hanna-Leena Mattila (born 1 September 1968) is a Finnish politician currently serving in the Parliament of Finland for the Centre Party at the Oulu constituency.

References

1968 births
Living people
Centre Party (Finland) politicians
Members of the Parliament of Finland (2015–19)
Members of the Parliament of Finland (2019–23)
21st-century Finnish women politicians
Women members of the Parliament of Finland